The  is a dam on the Kitakami River, located in Morioka, Iwate Prefecture on the island of Honshū, Japan.

History
Shijūshida Dam is the fourth in a series of five multipurpose dams built directly on the main stream of the Kitakami River, starting with the Tase Dam in 1941. The project was launched by the Economic Stabilization Bureau in 1947 following Typhoon Kathleen in September 1947 (which killed 1547 people). The need for a dam primarily for flood control was emphasized by Typhoon Ione in September of the following year, which killed an additional 1956 people. The dam was first completed by the Kajima Corporation in 1968.

Design
The Shijūshida Dam was designed as a concrete gravity arch dam; however, since the rocks on both banks were weak, the dam was completed as a hybrid design with earthen dams on the sides and a concrete gravity dam in the center. The project was complicated by the extreme acidity of the water (reaching pH of 4.0) due to runoff from the Matsuo mine upstream. This acidity resulted in the use of special concrete and alloy materials. Generators for the associated hydroelectric power plant product 15,100 KW of electricity.

References

Japan Commission on Large Dams. Dams in Japan: Past, Present and Future. CRC Press (2009). 
 photo page with data 
Official home page 

Dams in Iwate Prefecture
Dams completed in 1968
Hydroelectric power stations in Japan
Gravity dams
Morioka, Iwate